James Carnegie may refer to:

James Carnegie, 2nd Earl of Southesk (died 1669), Scottish nobleman
James Carnegie (died 1700), Scottish MP for Forfarshire
James Carnegie (died 1707), Scottish MP for Forfarshire
James Carnegie (pirate) (fl. 1716), pirate active in the Caribbean who sailed with Henry Jennings
James Carnegie, 5th Earl of Southesk (1692–1730), Scottish nobleman
Sir James Carnegie, 3rd Baronet (1716–1765), Scottish MP for Kincardineshire
Sir James Carnegie, 5th Baronet (1799–1849), Scottish MP for Aberdeen Burghs 
James Carnegie, 9th Earl of Southesk (1827–1905), his son, Lord Lieutenant of Kincardineshire
James Carnegie, 3rd Duke of Fife (1929–2015), Scottish peer